is a character created for Voiceroid and was later also developed for the Vocaloid 3 engine.

Development
She was originally created to help promote the recovery of the Tōhoku region, when the region devastated on March 11, 2011, by the 2011 Tōhoku earthquake and tsunami. Compared to previous VOICEROID+ software, Zunko is much improved with upgrades on the UI. The ability to adjust strength of intonation has been added, as well as the ability to insert pauses directly into the tuning screen. Users can also directly use ruby pronunciation markers in the text. It also reads text up to 4x fast and can output 22.1 kHz sample-rate audio files.

Additional Software
A fundraising campaign was in effect with the goal of creating a Vocaloid vocal for Zunko if the required funds (¥5,000,000) were met by July 20. Since then, the campaign was successful and her vocal was released in June 2014 for Vocaloid 3.

Her Voiceroid software was updated in 2015 to Voiceroid+ ex along with 5 other Voiceroid products.

Characteristics
Her character design is based on a zunda-mochi, a Tōhoku specialty, which is a traditional sweet made of green soybean paste.  She has two sisters Itako (older) and Kiritan (younger) who were both developed for UTAU, as well as a pet called "Zundamon".

See also
 List of Vocaloid products

References

Vocaloids introduced in 2011
Fictional singers